Teynham is a large village and civil parish in the borough of Swale in Kent, England. The parish lies between the towns of Sittingbourne and Faversham, immediately north of the A2 road, and includes the hamlet of Conyer on an inlet of the Swale, the channel that separates mainland Kent from the Isle of Sheppey. Other hamlets include Deerton Street, Frognal, and Teynham Street. Teynham also has a carnival court. There is selections every year when girls from 14-18 can audition to be Miss Teynham or a Teynham princess.

The village has a railway station, served by Southeastern trains running between London Victoria and Dover.

Origin of name

Charters of 798 to 801 and Domesday Monachorum – a series of Domesday-related texts kept at Canterbury Cathedral – mention it as Teneham, Taenham, Tenaham and Tenham. In Domesday Book the name occurs as "Therham" (probably a clerical error).

The historian JK Wallenberg (in 1931) suggests an Anglo-Saxon root, tynan, to enclose, followed by the Anglo-Saxon word "Hamm", a land drained by dykes. Another historian, Eilert Ekwall (in 1936), suggests an early owner named Teona, whose name is found in Teonanhyll in Berkshire.

In 1590, William Lambarde wrote his book Perambulation of Kent, in which Tenham is called the towne of ten houses. He also notes that in 1533, 105 acres of good ground in 'Brennet' (a former name of Tenham) were divided in ten parcels of land to grow fruit for King Henry.

J Harris, in his History of Kent (1719) calls it the "place of ten houses" (hams) but there must have been hundreds of places with 10 houses in Anglo-Saxon times.

It is also possibly "homestead of a man called Tena" or "homestead near the stream called Tene". Several other etymologies have been suggested.

The "y" in "Teynham" was apparently added by the Roper family, who have been Barons of Teynham from 1616.

Geography
It is an agricultural parish situated three miles east of Sittingbourne. The southern part of the parish is mainly devoted to agriculture, the principal crops being corn and hops with the produce of some famous orchards. Near the Swale is a large tract of land known as the Teynham Levels. This is devoted solely to the raising of sheep and cattle. At one time these marshes were not properly drained, and malaria was prevalent within the parish. So many residents got the disease that Teynham became known as an unhealthy place. The draining of the marshes eradicated this by 1953, which was carried out under the direction of a Commission formed for the purpose (and who had powers to levy a scot). The disease in the UK threatens a return to the Swale marshes, with dry habitats such as vacant pill boxes allowing over-wintering for vector species, however few carriers frequently come to the area and gradually derelict structures are being removed.

History
The town is a very ancient place and it is mentioned as having been the town in which Archbishops resided in early times. Kenulf, Coenwulf of Mercia, who reigned 794–819, gave the place to Christ Church, Canterbury, and afterwards a palace was built in the village or town as it was known then, which no longer exists.  Archbishop Baldwin of Forde (1184–91), Hubert Walter (1193–1207), Stephen Langton (1207–29), and Raynold (1313–28) all in turn lived at Teynham. Archbishop John de Stratford in 1345, entertained King Edward III at Teynham.  The church, St Mary's, in Teynham Street towards Conyer is Grade I listed, by the oldest buildings, Hinkley's Mill, Thatched Cottage, The Old Vicarage, Banks' farmhouse and cottage, Teynham Court and Crown House. The church stained glass windows date two centuries after its building, to the 15th century, restored 1873.

Later King Henry III granted the town the right to hold a market and fair. 
Richard Harrys (or Harris – in some accounts) who also lived at Teynham, and was a fruiterer to King Henry VIII instructed to plant 105 acres of land with cherries and apples that he had obtained from Flanders, and thus the village is one of the earliest in which the cherry was grown in Kent and England.

By 1848, Teynham had a population of 845 people. It was part of the Hundred of Teynham, in the Upper Division of the Lathe of Scray.
Most of the village income was made from cherry growing, with some from hops. Its patron was still the Archdeacon of Canterbury.

Amenities
There are several pubs throughout the parish, some with restaurants and take-aways, there is a substantial primary school with grounds for sports/games and a few shops, and a post office, and has a library on the London Road. The most historic buildings in Teynham are almost all relatively near the Saxon Shore Way, marina and wharf in Conyer and consequently the village and Conyer has some guesthouses.

Transport
The village is accessible off the M2 from the Sittingbourne junction, with the A2 providing short distance motor journeys and an easy cycle route to Sittingbourne and Faversham.  The railway station provides services to key destinations as follows (for London Victoria see above):

References

Sources
 Wallenberg, J K, Place-Names of Kent, Lundequistska Bokhandein, Uppsala, 1934.
 Ekwall, Eilert, Concise Oxford Dictionary of English Place-Names, fourth edition (Oxford, 1960)
 Harris, J, History of Kent (1719)

External links

Teynham Village Website

Villages in Kent
Civil parishes in Kent